Hilario Tristán Martínez (born 22 September 1989) is a former Mexican professional footballer.

Club career

Sonsonate
Tristán signed with Sonsonate of the Salvadoran Primera División for the Apertura 2018 tournament. He left the club in December 2018.

References

External links
 

Living people
1989 births
Association football midfielders
Chiapas F.C. footballers
Correcaminos UAT footballers
Loros UdeC footballers
Atlético Reynosa footballers
Murciélagos FC footballers
Cimarrones de Sonora players
Liga MX players
Ascenso MX players
Liga Premier de México players
Footballers from Nuevo León
Sportspeople from Monterrey
Mexican footballers